Warriewood is a suburb in northern Sydney, in the state of New South Wales, Australia. Warriewood is located 26 kilometres north of the Sydney central business district, in the local government area of Northern Beaches Council. Warriewood is part of the Northern Beaches region.

History
Warriewood takes its name from the Warriewood Estate that was subdivided in 1906 by Henry F. Halloran, who had purchased it from the McPherson family.

Commercial areas
Warriewood Square (previously known as Centro Warriewood) is a medium-size shopping centre in the southern part of the suburb. There is also a small cluster of shops located on Narrabeen Park Parade opposite Warriewood Beach. The suburb also contains a cinema complex, industrial area, a mini putt-putt golf, golf driving range and a McDonald's restaurant.

Education
Warriewood has a Catholic high school, Mater Maria Catholic College.

Housing
Warriewood Valley was identified by the NSW State Government as a potential land release area. It was subsequently rezoned to allow intensification of residential dwellings and infrastructure. The rezoning and development of Warriewood valley has also resulted in the cleaning up of the water bodies and wetlands and water management techniques were applies to deal with the flooding.

As of the 2016 Census, 49.1% of the dwellings in Warriewood were separate houses, 26.8% were semi-detached, and 23.8% were flats or apartments.

Infrastructure
 Boondah Reserve Sports Fields. Grass playing fields catering for multiple sports including soccer, netball and baseball.
 Boondah Road Sports Courts. Mixed-use hard surface courts completed in November 2020 and used for basketball and netball.
 North Narrabeen Reserve. Although the name may lead people to believe otherwise, the North Narrabeen Reserve sporting fields, including "Rat Park", are located within the boundaries of Warriewood.
 Sewage treatment plant operated by Sydney Water.
 Warriewood Valley Playground, also known as Rocket Park or Rocketship Playground.

Residents
As of the 2016 Census, Warriewood had a population of 7,501.  Their median age was 39, similar to the national median of 38. 70.0% of people were born in Australia; the most common other countries of birth were England 7.2%, New Zealand 2.0%, South Africa 1.6%, Brazil 1.1% and China 0.7%. 80.5% of people only spoke English at home; other languages spoken included Portuguese 1.4%, Italian 1.1%, Serbian 1.1%, Croatian 0.9% and German 0.9%.  The most commonly reported religious affiliation was No Religion 28.1%, followed by Catholic 26.6%, Anglican 19.8%, and Uniting Church 3.7%.

Transport
Warriewood is serviced by the B-Line bus service, launched in November 2017 with buses running between Mona Vale and Wynyard. Warriewood has undercover bus shelters located on both sides of Pittwater Road and a dedicated two-storey commuter car park on the eastern side of the road.

References

External links
  

Suburbs of Sydney
Northern Beaches Council